Opportunity Charter School is an American charter school in the Harlem neighborhood of the New York City borough of Manhattan. It serves approximately 400 students in grades 6–12. It was chartered by the New York State Board of Regents in 2004. The charter school serves disabled and academically struggling students. A fight to renew its charter was won in 2011 with a two-year renewal granted and the school's website reported a five-year renewal in 2012.

See also 

 List of high schools in New York City

References

External links 
 

2004 establishments in New York City
Charter schools in New York City
Educational institutions established in 2004
Schools in Harlem
Public high schools in Manhattan
Public middle schools in Manhattan